Ntozake Shange (October 18, 1948 – October 27, 2018) was an American playwright and poet. As a Black feminist, she addressed issues relating to race and Black power in much of her work. She is best known for her Obie Award-winning play, For Colored Girls Who Have Considered Suicide / When the Rainbow Is Enuf (1975). She also penned novels including Sassafrass, Cypress & Indigo (1982), Liliane (1994), and Betsey Brown (1985), about an African-American girl run away from home. Among Shange's honors and awards were fellowships from the Guggenheim Foundation and Lila Wallace Reader's Digest Fund, a Shelley Memorial Award from the Poetry Society of America, and a Pushcart Prize. In April 2016, Barnard College announced that it had acquired Shange's archive. She lived in Brooklyn, New York. Shange had one daughter, Savannah Shange. Shange was married twice: to the saxophonist David Murray and the painter McArthur Binion, Savannah's father, with both marriages ending in divorce.

Early life
Shange was born Paulette Linda Williams in Trenton, New Jersey, to an upper-middle-class family. Her father, Paul T. Williams, was a surgeon, and her mother, Eloise Williams, was an educator and a psychiatric social worker. When she was aged eight, Shange's family moved to the racially segregated city of St. Louis. As a result of the Brown v. Board of Education court decision, Shange was bused to a white school where she endured racism and racist attacks.

Shange's family had a strong interest in the arts and encouraged her artistic education. Among the guests at their home were Dizzy Gillespie, Miles Davis, Chuck Berry, Paul Robeson, and W. E. B. Du Bois. From an early age, Shange took an interest in poetry. While growing up with her family in Trenton, Shange attended poetry readings with her younger sister Wanda (now known as the playwright Ifa Bayeza). These poetry readings fostered an early interest for Shange in the South in particular, and the loss it represented to young Black children who migrated to the North with their parents. In 1956, Shange's family moved to St. Louis, Missouri, where Shange was sent several miles away from home to a non-segregated school that allowed her to receive "gifted" education. While attending this non-segregated school, Shange faced overt racism and harassment. These experiences would later go on to heavily influence her work.

When Shange was 13, she returned to Lawrence Township, Mercer County, New Jersey, where she graduated in 1966 from  Trenton Central High School. In 1966, Shange enrolled at Barnard College (class of 1970) at Columbia University in New York City. During her time at Barnard, Shange met fellow Barnard student and would-be poet Thulani Davis. The two poets would later go on to collaborate on various works. Shange graduated cum laude in American Studies, then earned a master's degree in the same field from the University of Southern California in Los Angeles. However, her college years were not all pleasant. She married during her first year in college, but the marriage did not last long. Depressed over her separation and with a strong sense of bitterness and alienation, she attempted suicide. In 1970 in San Francisco, having come to terms with her depression and alienation, Shange rejected "Williams" as a slave name and "Paulette" (after her father Paul) as patriarchal, and asked South African musicians Ndikho and Nomusa Xaba (also spelled Ndikko and Zaba) to bestow an African name. In 1971 Ndikho duly chose Ntozake and Shange, which Shange respectively glossed as Xhosa "She who comes with her own things" and Zulu "She who walks like a lion".

Career
In 1975, Shange moved back to New York City, after earning her master's degree in American Studies in 1973 from the University of Southern California in Los Angeles, California. She is acknowledged as having been a founding poet of the Nuyorican Poets Café. In that year her first and most well-known play was produced — for colored girls who have considered suicide / when the rainbow is enuf. First produced Off-Broadway, the play soon moved on to Broadway at the Booth Theater and won several awards, including the Obie Award, Outer Critics Circle Award, and the AUDELCO Award. This play, her most famous work, was a 20-part choreopoem — a term Shange coined to describe her groundbreaking dramatic form, combining of poetry, dance, music, and song — that chronicled the lives of women of color in the United States. The poem was eventually made into the stage play, was then published in book form in 1977. In 2010, the choreopoem was adapted into a film (For Colored Girls, directed by Tyler Perry). Shange subsequently wrote other successful plays, including Spell No. 7, a 1979 choreopoem that explores the Black experience, and an adaptation of Bertolt Brecht's Mother Courage and Her Children (1980), which won an Obie Award.

In 1978, Shange became an associate of the Women's Institute for Freedom of the Press (WIFP). WIFP is an American nonprofit publishing organization. The organization works to increase communication between women and connect the public with forms of women-based media. Shange taught in the Creative Writing Program at the University of Houston from 1984 to 1986. While there she wrote the ekphrastic poetry collection Ridin the Moon in Texas: Word Paintings and served as thesis advisor for poet and playwright Annie Finch. In 2003, Shange wrote and oversaw the production of Lavender Lizards and Lilac Landmines: Layla's Dream while serving as a visiting artist at the University of Florida, Gainesville.

Shange's individual poems, essays, and short stories have appeared in numerous magazines and anthologies, including The Black Scholar, Yardbird, Ms., Essence Magazine, The Chicago Tribune, VIBE, Daughters of Africa, and Third-World Women.

Relationship to the Black Arts Movement

The Black Arts Movement—also known as BAM—has been described as the "aesthetic and spiritual sister of the Black Power concept." The Black Arts Movement is a subset of the Black Power Movement. Larry Neal described the Black Arts Movement as a "radical reordering of the western cultural aesthetic." Key concepts of BAM were focused on a "separate symbolism, mythology, critique, and iconology" as well as the African American's desire for "self-determination and nationhood." BAM consisted of actors, actresses, choreographers, musicians, novelists, poets, photographers, and artists. While male artists such as Amiri Baraka heavily dominated the Black Arts Movement, some notable women writers of the movement were Gwendolyn Brooks, Nikki Giovanni, Rosa Guy, Lorraine Hansberry, Lucille Clifton, and Sonia Sanchez, among others. Although Shange is described as a "post-Black artist", her work was decidedly feminist, whereas BAM has been criticized as misogynistic and "sexism had been widely and hotly debated within movement publications and organizations." Corresponding with the idea that art from BAM was a "radical reordering of the western cultural aesthetic," Shange herself described her atypical writing style. In regards to her plays, she stated: "A play has a form that has to be finished. A performance piece has an organic form, but it can even flow. And there doesn't have to be some ultimate climax in it. And there does not have to be a denouement."

Though Shange's work did have a "radical reordering of western cultural aesthetics" with its spelling, structure, and style, Baraka—one of the leading male figures of the movement—denied her as a post-Black artist. With regard to Shange as a part of the black aesthetic and as a post-Black artist, he claimed "that several women writers, among them Michelle Wallace [sic] and Ntozake Shange, like [Ishmael] Reed, had their own 'Hollywood' aesthetic, one of 'capitulation' and 'garbage.'"

In terms of a black aesthetic, Shange described different styles of writing for different parts of the country, stating: "There's not a California style, but there are certain feelings and a certain freeness that set those writers off from those in the Chicago-St. Louis-Detroit tripod group...so that the chauvinism that you might find that's exclusionary, in that triangle, you don't find too much in California." Shange set her writing apart from the Black aesthetic of the Black arts movement by creating a "special aesthetic" for black women "to an extent." She claimed, "the same rhetoric that is used to establish the Black Aesthetic, we must use to establish a women's aesthetic, which is to say that those parts of reality that are ours, those things about our bodies, the cycles of our lives that have been ignored for centuries in all castes and classes of our people, are to be dealt with now."

Death 
Shange died in her sleep on October 27, 2018, aged 70, in an assisted-living facility in Bowie, Maryland. She had been ill, having suffered a series of strokes in 2004, but she "had been on the mend lately, creating new work, giving readings and being feted for her work." Her sister Ifa Bayeza (with whom she co-wrote the 2010 novel Some Sing, Some Cry) said: "It's a huge loss for the world. I don't think there's a day on the planet when there's not a young woman who discovers herself through the words of my sister."

Awards
NDEA fellow, 1974
Obie Award
Outer Critics Circle Award
Audience Development Committee (Audelco) Award
Mademoiselle Award
Frank Silvera Writers' Workshop Award, 1978
Los Angeles Times Book Prize for Poetry, 1981 (for Three Pieces)
Guggenheim fellowship, 1981
Medal of Excellence, Columbia University, 1981
Obie Award, 1981, for Mother Courage and Her Children
Nori Eboraci Award
Barnard College, 1988
Lila Wallace-Reader's Digest Fund annual writer's award, 1992
Paul Robeson Achievement Award, 1992
Arts and Cultural Achievement Award
National Coalition of 100 Black Women (Pennsylvania chapter), 1992
Taos World Poetry Heavyweight Champion, 1992, 1993, 1994
Living Legend Award, National Black Theatre Festival, 1993
Claim Your Life Award
WDAS-AM/FM, 1993
Monarch Merit Award
National Council for Culture and Arts
Supersisters trading card set (one of the cards featured Shange's name and picture), 1979
Pushcart Prize
St. Louis Walk of Fame inductee
 Proclamation of "Ntozake Shange Day" (Borough of Manhattan, New York) by Congressman Charles Rangel on June 14, 2014.
 Shelley Memorial Award

Nominations
Emmy Award, 1977, nominee, Outstanding Writing in a Comedy-Variety or Music Special,  An Evening with Diana Ross The Big Event  
Tony Award, 1977, nominee, Tony Award for Best Play, For Colored Girls Who Have Considered Suicide / When the Rainbow Is Enuf
Grammy Award, 1978, nominee, Grammy Award for Best Spoken Word Album, For Colored Girls Who Have Considered Suicide / When the Rainbow Is Enuf

Works

Plays
 for colored girls who have considered suicide/ when the rainbow is enuf (1975). Nominated for a Tony Award, Grammy Award, and Emmy Award; first published 1976; updated 2010 with a new section, "Positive" (Scribner). 
 A Photograph: Lovers-in-Motion (1977). Produced Off-Broadway at the Public Theater.
 Where the Mississippi Meets the Amazon (1977).
 A Photograph: A Study of Cruelty (1977).
 Boogie Woogie Landscapes (1979). First produced at Frank Silvera's Writers' Workshop in New York, then on Broadway at the Symphony Space Theatre.
 Spell #7 (written spell #7) or spell #7: Geechee jibaro Quik magic trance manual for technologically stressed third world people (1979). Produced Off-Broadway at Joseph Papp's New York Shakespeare Festival Public Theater.
 Black and White Two Dimensional Planes (1979).
 Mother Courage and Her Children (1980). Produced off-Broadway at the Public Theater. Winner of a 1981 Obie Award.
 Three for a Full Moon (1982).
 Bocas (1982). First produced at the Mark Taper Forum in Los Angeles.
 From Okra to Greens/A Different Kinda Love Story (1983).
 Three views of Mt. Fuji (1987). First produced in San Francisco at The Lorraine Hansberry Theatre; first New York production at the New Dramatists.
 Daddy Says (1989).
 Whitewash (1994).

Poetry
 Melissa & Smith (1976).
 Natural Disasters and Other Festive Occasions (1977)
 Nappy Edges (1978)
 A Daughter's Geography (1983)
 From Okra to Greens (1984)
 Ridin' the Moon in Texas: Word Paintings (St. Martin's Press, 1987)
 The Love Space Demands (a continuing saga) (St. Martin's Press, 1987)
 A Photograph: Lovers in Motion: A Drama (S. French, 1977)
 Some Men (1981)
 Three Pieces (St. Martin's Press, 1992)
 I Live in Music (1994)
 The Sweet Breath of Life: A Poetic Narrative of the African-American Family (Atria Books, 2004). Photography by Kamoinge Inc.
 "Enuf"
 "With No Immediate Cause"
 "you are sucha fool"
 "People of Watts" (first published November 1993 in VIBE Magazine)
 "Blood Rhythms"
 "Poet Hero"
 Wild Beauty (Atria Books, 2017)

Novels
 Sassafrass (Shmeless Hussy Press, 1976)
 For Colored Girls Who Have Considered Suicide/When the Rainbow is Enuf (Shameless Hussy Press, 1976)
 Sassafrass, Cypress & Indigo (1982)
 Betsey Brown (St. Martin's Press, 1985)
 Liliane (1994)
 Some Sing, Some Cry (2010) (with Ifa Bayeza)

Children's books
 Coretta Scott (2009)
 Ellington Was Not a Street (2003)
 Float Like a Butterfly: Muhammad Ali, the Man Who Could Float Like a Butterfly and Sting Like a Bee (2002)
 Daddy Says (2003)
 Whitewash (1997)

Essays and non-fiction
 See No Evil: Prefaces, Essays & Accounts, 1976–1983 (1984)
Foreword in The Black Book by Robert Mapplethorpe (1986)
 if i can cook / you know god can (1998)
Dance We Do: A Poet Explores Black Dance (2020)

References

Further reading

External links

 Official website
Guide to the Ntozake Shange Papers at Barnard College
Ntozake Shange page, African American Literature Book Club

Ntozake Shange Bio, Henry Holt Publishers:
Multimanifestations: Ntozake Shange Page
Hilton Als, "Color Vision" (profile of Ntozake Shange), The New Yorker, November 8, 2010,

1948 births
2018 deaths
20th-century American novelists
21st-century American novelists
African-American dramatists and playwrights
African-American novelists
African-American poets
American women novelists
Barnard College alumni
African-American feminists
American feminists
Obie Award recipients
American women dramatists and playwrights
African-American activists
Novelists from New Jersey
American women poets
American women essayists
20th-century American women writers
21st-century American women writers
20th-century American poets
20th-century American dramatists and playwrights
21st-century American poets
20th-century American essayists
21st-century American essayists
People from Lawrence Township, Mercer County, New Jersey
Trenton Central High School alumni
Writers from Trenton, New Jersey
African-American dancers
African-American choreographers
American choreographers
20th-century African-American women writers
20th-century African-American writers
21st-century African-American women